NFH may refer to

National Fish Hatchery, see National Fish Hatchery System and List of National Fish Hatcheries in the United States
NATO Frigate Helicopter, a type of NHIndustries NH90 military helicopter
Neville Fernando Teaching Hospital, one of the largest private hospitals in Sri Lanka
Norwegian College of Fishery Science
Nykøbing Falster Håndboldklub, a Danish handball club

See also
NFHS (disambiguation)